The Old Jewish Cemetery, in Lublin, Poland, is located on a hill between Kalinowszczyzna and Sienna Streets. The cemetery overlooks the Old Town and is entirely surrounded by a high, seventeenth-century wall. It is located on the site of a former medieval fortress, and was once surrounded by numerous backwaters.

The cemetery was probably founded in 1541, although some sources give a much earlier date. The first written mention of the cemetery dates from 1555, when a privilege was issued to Polish Jews permitting burial in the area.

Many distinguished representatives of the Lublin Jewish community are buried there. Many of them have monumental and richly decorated matzevot headstones, but there are also matzevot without ornaments, which are evidence of modesty.  In 1939 the cemetery probably held up to 3,000 matzevot. During the German occupation of Poland in 1939 and the start of the Holocaust, many of the matzevot were demolished or were used for street paving. The matzevot of several significant figures, however, remain.

In the 1980s, the Association for the Preservation of the Jewish Heritage in Lublin (Towarzystwo Opieki nad Pamiątkami Kultury Żydowskiej) began to put the cemetery in order and to make a detailed inventory. Between 1988 and 1991 several antisemitic acts of vandalism took place, as a result of which 40 further matzevot (Macewy) were destroyed. 

Currently, the Old Jewish Cemetery in Lublin provides some of the last surviving physical evidence of the centuries-old presence of Jews in the city.

Notable interments
Solomon Luria
Yaakov Yitzchak of Lublin
Jacob Pollak
Shalom Shachna

References
 http://www.um.lublin.eu/en/index.php?t=200&id=47592 
 http://cemetery.jewish.org.pl/list/c_55
 http://www.sztetl.org.pl/en/article/lublin/12,cemeteries/1730,the-old-jewish-cemetery-kalinowszczyzna-sienna-streets-/
 http://teatrnn.pl/leksykon/taxonomy/term/5521

External links

 http://jewishphotolibrary.smugmug.com/EUROPE/EUROPEnortheast/POLAND/POLANDLublinOldJewishCemetery/
 http://www.kirkuty-lublin.pl/
 http://lublin.jewish.org.pl/history.html 

Jewish cemeteries in Poland
Jews and Judaism in Lublin
Holocaust locations in Poland
Cemetery vandalism and desecration